Snuff the Punk is the debut studio album by Christian metal band P.O.D. The album was released on January 25, 1994 on Chula Vista, California-based Rescue Records, which was owned by Noah Bernardo, Sr (band members Sonny Sandoval's uncle and Wuv Bernardo's father). It was remixed, remastered and re-released with new artwork by indie label Diamante in 1999. The original cover showed a cartoon character with a gun, but the re-released album cover did not.

Legacy
In July 2014, Guitar World ranked Snuff the Punk at number 22 in their "Superunknown: 50 Iconic Albums That Defined 1994" list. Cleveland Scene noted that the album was one of the first to be categorized as nu metal.

Track listing

Personnel
P.O.D.
All band members are credited by their first name only, bar Noah Bernardo, who is credited as “Wuvy” in the liner notes. 

Sonny Sandoval – vocals
Marcos Curiel – guitar
Traa Daniels – bass guitar
Noah "Wuvy" Bernardo – drums

References

P.O.D. albums
1994 debut albums